Pakistan Tourism Development Corporation or PTDC is an organization of the Government of Pakistan. PTDC is governed by the Board of Directors and provides transportation to various areas and owns and runs several motels across the country. It was incorporated on 30 March 1970. Sayed Zulfiqar Abbas Bukhari is serving as the Chairman of the organization.

In 2018, the British Backpacker Society ranked Pakistan as the top country for adventure travel destination. In response to the ranking, the Pakistan Tourism Development Corporation introduced a visa on arrival system for tourists visiting Pakistan from 24 countries, with the Managing Director of the Pakistan Tourism Development Corporation stating that the ranking was a "huge honour" for Pakistan.

In 2017, tourism contributed around $19.4 billion to Pakistan's economy, according to World Travel and Tourism Council (WTTC). Within a decade, WTTC expects it to rise to $36.1 billion.

Objectives
 Development and improvement of PTDC Tourist Information Centres, Hotels and Motels throughout Pakistan to attract domestic and international tourists.
 To produce publicity and promotional material for distribution at home and abroad.
 To conduct promotional programmes, activities and events for attracting tourists.
 To create awareness of tourism throughout the private sector, Pakistan Missions abroad, PIA offices, tour operators, travel agents and hoteliers.
To provide familiarization and package tours, tourist transportation and ground handling to group tours.
 To hold conferences, seminars, and workshops to promote and create awareness of tourism, and to improve the image of Pakistan.

Functions
 Planning and development - identification and implementation of projects dealing with tourism infrastructure such as Motels, Recreational units, Resorts etc.
 Publicity and promotion of tourist products and projects, production of tourist literature, domestic and foreign publicity.
 Operation of AHP Ltd. a Public Limited Company, which manages and operates Flashman's Hotel in Rawalpindi.
 Management of all hospitality units operated by PTDC Motels (Pvt.) Lt. in various tourist destinations of the country where the private sector is shy to invest.
 Management of Pakistan Tours (Pvt.) Ltd, which provides ground handling and transport facilities for international and domestic groups.

Motels
PTDC runs motels at a number of locations throughout the country to provide quality low cost accommodation for visitors. These motels are located at the following locations:

 Astak
 Khalti (Ghizer)
 Ayubia, Islamabad
 Booni
 Besham
 Chitral
 Karimabad, Hunza
 Khuzdar, Baluchistan
 Miandam, Swat
 Saidu Sharif, Swat
 Panakot
 Satpara
 Sust, Hunza
 Torkham, near Peshawar
 Wagah, near Lahore
 Ziarat, Quetta
 Naran
 Shogran
 Skardu, Gilgit Baltistan
 Khaplu, Ghanche

See also

 Sindh Tourism Development Corporation
 Pearl-Continental Hotels & Resorts in Pakistan
 Tourism in Pakistan

References

External links
  Pakistan Tourism Development Corporation- Homepage
 Tourism Development Corporation Of Punjab, Pakistan, Homepage
 Official Website For PTDC Motels Room Reservation
 Khyber Pakhtunkhwa Tourism Development Corporation, Government of Khyber Pakhtunkhwa, Pakistan
 Tourism Development Corporation Of Sindh, Pakistan
 Tourist Attractions in Balochistan, Pakistan
 Baluchistan Tourism Development Corporation, Pakistan
 Tourism in Azad Kashmir, Pakistan
 PTDC Objectives and Facilities

Tourism in Pakistan
Government-owned companies of Pakistan
Hospitality companies of Pakistan
Motels
Pakistan federal departments and agencies
Tourism agencies